Douglas S. Wildey (May 2, 1922 – October 5, 1994) was an American cartoonist and comic book artist best known for creating the 1964 animated television series Jonny Quest for Hanna-Barbera Productions.

Biography

Early life and career 

Wildey was born and raised in Yonkers, New York, adjacent to New York City. He did World War II military service at Naval Air Station Barbers Point in Hawaii, where he began his art career as a cartoonist for the base newspaper. He recalled his professional start as freelancing for the magazine and comic book company Street & Smith in 1947. Because comic-book writer and artist credits were not routinely given during this era, the earliest confirmed Wildey works are two signed pieces in this publisher's Top Secret #9 (June 1949): a one-page house ad and the 10-page adventure story "Queen in Jeopardy", by an unknown writer.

He went on to draw primarily Western stories for Youthful Magazines comics including Buffalo Bill, Gunsmoke (unrelated to the later television series), and Indian Fighter. He also contributed to the publishers Master Comics, Story Comics, Cross Publications and possibly others, puckishly observing that he'd worked for every publisher except EC, "the good one".

In 1952, Wildey moved his family — wife Ellen and daughter Debbie  — to Tucson, Arizona. Two years later, he began a regular stint at Atlas Comics, the 1950s forerunner of Marvel Comics, where he drew dozens of Western stories through 1957, primarily four- and five-page tales in such titles as Frontier Western. His art also appeared in the Atlas horror-fantasy comics Journey into Unknown Worlds, Marvel Tales, Mystery Tales, Mystic, Strange Tales, Uncanny Tales, and others.

Historian Ken Quattro describes Wildey's most "noteworthy" Western as the 19-issue Atlas series Outlaw Kid, "his take on the classic Western antihero", in which Wildey illustrated three to four stories per issue:

Much of this work was reprinted by Marvel from 1970 through 1974, exposing his work to a later generation.

After an Atlas Comics retrenchment in 1957 — during which the company mixed a trove of inventory stories by Wildey and many others with new material for two to three years — Wildey freelanced on a small number of standalone anthology stories for two other publishers: Harvey Comics, in the science fiction/fantasy titles Alarming Tales #3-5 (Jan.-Sept. 1958), and Black Cat Mystic #62 (March 1958), Hi-School Romance #73 (March 1958) and Warfront #34 (Sept. 1958); and DC Comics, in Tales of the Unexpected #33 & 35 (Nov. 1958, March 1959), House of Secrets #17 (Feb.1959), My Greatest Adventure #28 & 32 (Nov. 1958 & June 1959), and House of Mystery #89 (Aug. 1959). He also later drew the first issue of Dell Comics' television series spin-off Dr. Kildare, a.k.a. Four Color #1337, June 1962.

In either 1959 or 1961 (sources vary) he took over the art for writer Leslie Charteris' long-running New York Herald Tribune Syndicate comic strip The Saint. Some of their strips were inked by Dick Ayers as the deadlines of producing a daily and Sunday strip proved daunting. The strip ended in 1962. Adding credence to the latter date is Wildey spending part of 1960, possibly only a month, penciling his idol Milton Caniff's famed Steve Canyon comic strip and trying unsuccessfully to launch his own syndicated strip.

Two such proposed strips would help provide a character name and some narrative background to Wildey's later animated television series, Jonny Quest. As he described in 1986,

Television animation 
Following the end of The Saint comic strip in 1962, Wildey found, through an ad in the National Cartoonists Society newsletter, what was initially a one-week television animation job in Los Angeles, California, working under artist Alex Toth on Cambria Productions' 1962 animated series Space Angel. Wildey eventually worked on the series for "about 12 or 14 weeks", after which, he recalled in 1986,

Wildey wrote and drew a presentation, using such magazines as Popular Science, Popular Mechanics, and Science Digest "to project what would be happening 10 years hence", and devising or fancifully updating such devices as a "snowskimmer" and hydrofoils. When Hanna-Barbera could not obtain the rights to Jack Armstrong, the studio had Wildey rework the concept. Wildey "went home and wrote Jonny Quest that night — which was not that tough." For inspiration he drew on Jackie Cooper and Frankie Darro movies, Milton Caniff's comic strip Terry and the Pirates, and, at the behest of Hanna-Barbera, the James Bond movie Dr. No. Hanna-Barbera refused to give him a "created by" credit, Wildey said in 1986, and he and studio "finally arrived on 'Based on an idea created by', and that was my credit."

The prime-time TV animated series Jonny Quest debuted on ABC on September 18, 1964. As comics historian Daniel Herman wrote,

Wildey did not design the more cartoonishly-drawn comic relief pet dog, Bandit, which was designed by animator Richard Bickenbach.

Wildey went on to work on animated series including The Herculoids, Jana of the Jungle, Return to the Planet of the Apes (1975), Godzilla (1978 TV series) (1978), Mister T (1983), and Chuck Norris: Karate Kommandos (1986).

Return to comics 
In the mid-1960s, Wildey returned to comic books, drawing stories for the premiere issues of Harvey Comics' Thrill-O-Rama, Unearthly Spectaculars (both Oct. 1965 series) and Double-Dare Adventures (Dec. 1965). Most significantly during this time, he collaborated with writer Gaylord DuBois on Gold Key Comics' licensed series Tarzan when that long-running comic, which had been reprinting stories drawn by Russ Manning, began producing new work beginning with issue #179 (Sept. 1968). The duo's work appeared through issue #187 (Sept. 1969).

After a hiatus from comic books, broken only by three 1971 stories for Skywald Publications' black-and-white horror-comics magazines Psycho and Nightmare, plus the Haunted Tank story "The Armored Ark" in DC Comics' G.I. Combat #153 (May 1972), Wildey created the comic strip Ambler, which ran from 1972 to 1975. Syndicated to newspapers by the Chicago Tribune New York News Syndicate, the contemporary strip chronicled the adventures of an itinerant folk musician.

Afterward, Wildey returned to comic books to do stories for Archie Comics' horror-humor anthology series Mad House, Gold Key's Mystery Comics Digest, and DC's Our Army at War and Sgt. Rock, among other titles. Returning to his Western roots, he drew the feature "Jonah Hex" in DC's Weird Western Tales #26 (Feb. 1975) and co-created with writer Larry Lieber the feature "Kid Cody, Gunfighter" in Atlas/Seaboard Comics' Western Action #1 (Feb. 1975).

As both writer and artist, Wildey created his own Western feature, "Rio", that ran in Eclipse Comics' Eclipse Monthly #1-10 (Aug. 1983 — July 1984), and he returned to his most prominent creation that decade with a Jonny Quest comic-book series published by Comico. Wildey wrote and drew the stories in Jonny Quest #1 (July 1986) and Jonny Quest Classics #1-3 (May–July 1987), and provided several covers. Comico also reprinted several of his Rio stories in a June 1987 one-shot, and Wildey produced new Rio stories for Dark Horse Comics' two-issue miniseries Rio at Bay (July-Aug. 1992).

His last original comics work was the painted art for the eight-page Western tale "The End of the Time of Leinard" by writers Faye Perozich and Harlan Ellison in Dark Horse's Harlan Ellison's Dream Corridor Special (Jan. 1995).

Death 
Wildey died of heart failure in Las Vegas, Nevada, on October 5, 1994.

Bibliography 
In 1971, Jim Vadeboncoeur Jr. published a Wildey portfolio, The Movie Cowboy, consisting of 26 illustrations sized 12x18 inches. Said historian Quattro, "Wildey shifted seamlessly between pen and brush, from the finest pen strokes imaginable, to the soft nuances of wash, from the monumental close-up of a grizzled Martin Landau, to the sunny sweetness of two women waiting for a stagecoach."

References

External links 

The Doug Wildey Index, Comicartille Library
"A Walk on the Wildey Side" by Tom Conroy

1922 births
1994 deaths
American comics artists
American storyboard artists
Hanna-Barbera people
United States Navy personnel of World War II